Patrick Richard Heffron (June 1, 1856 – November 23, 1927) was an American prelate of the Catholic Church. He served as the second Bishop of Winona from 1910 until his death in 1927.

Early life and education
Patrick Richard Heffron was born in New York City on June 1, 1856, to Patrick and Margaret (née O'Brien) Heffron. The family later moved to Ripon, Wisconsin, and settled in Olmsted County, Minnesota, in 1864. He received his early education at public schools in New York and Wisconsin, and attended high school in Mantorville. Afterwards he attended business college and law school in Rochester.

Deciding to enter the priesthood, Heffron began his studies under the Benedictines at St. John's College in Collegeville, graduating in 1878. He then continued his studies at the Grand Séminaire de Montréal and received the degree of Doctor of Divinity in 1883.

Priesthood
While in Montreal, Heffron was ordained a priest on December 22, 1884 by Bishop Édouard-Charles Fabre. Following his ordination, he returned to Minnesota and taught theology at St. Thomas Seminary for two years. Archbishop John Ireland sent him to further his studies in Rome, where he earned doctorates in theology and canon law from the college at Santa Maria sopra Minerva in 1889.

Returning from Europe, Heffron served as rector of the Cathedral of Saint Paul from 1889 to 1896. He then returned to St. Thomas Seminary, being appointed vice rector in 1896. In 1897, he was promoted to the seminary's rector.

Bishop of Winona
On March 4, 1910, Heffron was appointed Bishop of Winona by Pope Pius X. He received his episcopal consecration on the following May 19 from Archbishop Ireland, with Bishops James McGolrick and James Trobec serving as co-consecrators.

When Heffron became bishop in 1910, the Diocese of Winona contained a Catholic population of over 49,000 with 91 priests, 116 churches, and 29 parochial schools with 4,700 students. By the time of his death in 1927, there was a Catholic population of nearly 69,000 with 130 priests, 125 churches, and 42 parochial schools with over 8,000 students. He opened Cotter High School in 1911 and St. Mary's College in 1912. 

On August 27, 1915, Heffron was shot twice while celebrating private mass by Laurence M. Lesches, a diocesan priest.  Lesches had been angry at Heffron for denying him his own parish due to Lesches' arrogant behavior and emotional instability. Heffron survived, but Lesches was committed to a mental hospital for the rest of his life. 

He was named an assistant to the papal throne by Pope Benedict XV in November 1920.

Death and legacy 
Heffron died from brain cancer on November 23, 1927.

References

Episcopal succession

1860 births
1927 deaths
Religious leaders from New York City
Roman Catholic bishops of Winona
Saint Mary's University of Minnesota
University and college founders